Fenice has been borne by at least two ships of the Italian Navy and may refer to:

 , a  launched in 1943 and stricken in 1965.
 , a  launched in 1989 and stricken in 2017. 

Italian Navy ship names